Osmium pentafluoride is an inorganic compound with the formula OsF5.  It is a blue-green solid. Like the pentafluorides of Ru, Rh, and Ir, OsF5 exists as a tetramer in the solid state.

Preparation 
Osmium pentafluoride can be prepared by reduction of osmium hexafluoride with iodine as a solution in iodine pentafluoride:
10 OsF6 +  I2  →   10 OsF5 +  2 IF5

References

Osmium compounds
Fluorides
Platinum group halides